Kesteven is a surname, and may refer to:

 Charles Kesteven (died 1923), British government law officer in India 
 Hereward Kesteven (1881–1964), Australian medical scientist
 John Kesteven (1849–unknown), English cricketer

See also 

 Kesteven

Surnames
English-language surnames
Surnames of English origin
Surnames of British Isles origin